Bjarni Vigfússon Thorarensen (December 30, 1786 – August 24, 1841) was an Icelandic poet and official. He was deputy governor of northern and eastern Iceland. As a poet he was influenced by classicism and romanticism. Politically he was aligned with the Fjölnismenn and favored the reestablishment of the Althing at Þingvellir. He was a friend of Jónas Hallgrímsson whose own poetry was influenced by Bjarni's work.

Bjarni's best known work is Íslands minni, also known as Eldgamla Ísafold.

See also 

 List of Icelandic writers
 Icelandic literature

References
Jónas Hallgrímsson: Bjarni Thorarensen Information on Jónas Hallgrímsson's elegy on Bjarni
Bjarni Vigfússon Thórarensen Britannica article
Academic Dictionaries and Encyclopedias

External links
Ljóð eftir Bjarna Thorarensen Several of Bjarni's poems

`

Bjarni Thorarensen
Bjarni Thorarensen
1786 births
1841 deaths
Bjarni Thorarensen
Bjarni Thorarensen